CubeSmart (NYSE: CUBE), is a self-administered and self-managed real estate company focused on the ownership, operation, acquisition, and development of self-storage facilities in the United States. CubeSmart, a REIT (Real Estate Investment Trust), operates more than 1200 self-storage facilities. 

As of December 31, 2019, it owned 523 self-storage properties in 40 states and the District of Columbia containing 36.6 million rentable square feet. It is the 4th largest self-storage company in the United States.

The company also provides climate-controlled units for customers with sensitive items that require protection from extreme temperatures.

The company was known as U-Store-It Trust until 2011.

History
CubeSmart was established in 2004, as a Maryland corporation.

The company held their initial public offering in July 2004. 

In December 2008, the company relocated its corporate headquarters to Wayne, Pennsylvania.

On September 14, 2011, the organization was renamed as CubeSmart.

In December 2013, the company relocated its corporate headquarters to Malvern, Pennsylvania. 

According to industry magazine Inside Self-Storage, CubeSmart is one of the top four self-storage operators in the United States by total net rentable square footage.

Currently, the company owns and/or operates over 1200 self-storage facilities nationwide. With revenues of over $444M, the company has over 3,000 teammates across the United States and in our corporate headquarters, hCube, in Malvern, PA.

CubeSmart operates in Alabama, Arizona, California, Colorado, Connecticut, Florida, Georgia, Illinois, Indiana, Iowa, Kansas, Kentucky, Louisiana, Maine, Maryland, Massachusetts, Michigan, Minnesota, Mississippi, Missouri, Nevada, New Hampshire, New Jersey, New Mexico, New York, North Carolina, Ohio, Oklahoma, Oregon, Pennsylvania, Rhode Island, South Carolina, Tennessee, Texas, Utah, Vermont, Virginia, Washington, West Virginia, Wisconsin, and the District of Columbia.

References

External links
 
 

2004 establishments in Maryland
2004 initial public offerings
American companies established in 2004
Companies listed on the New York Stock Exchange
Financial services companies established in 2004
Real estate companies established in 2004
Real estate investment trusts of the United States
Storage companies
Companies based in Chester County, Pennsylvania